Abbey is a village in the Canadian province of Saskatchewan within the Rural Municipality of Miry Creek No. 229 and Census Division No. 8. This village is in the south-western region of the province, north-west of the city of Swift Current. Abbey is serviced by Highway 32 near Highway 738.

History 
In 1910, the first post office used by area residents was Longworth, located in the home of Cassie Baldwin. The townsite of Abbey was originally owned by a man named D.F. Kennedy. In 1913, the Canadian Pacific Railway (CPR) bought a quarter section of land from him to build a rail line. The CPR gave Mr. Kennedy the honour of naming the community, giving it the name Abbey - the name of the Kennedy farm in Ireland. Abbey incorporated as a village on September 2, 1913.

Abbey Fire Hall

Abbey has one municipal heritage property on the Canadian Register of Historic Places, the Abbey Fire Hall. Constructed in 1919 in response to a large fire that threatened the community in September 1918, the fire station was part of an upgrade to fire protection in Abbey. The station remained in service until a new fire station was constructed in 1975. The station is currently not in use, however the siren on the station tower is still used to signal emergencies in the community.

Parks and recreation
It was built in 1950 and is a par 35, 9-hole course with sand greens and a total length of 2085 yards.

Demographics 

In the 2016 Census of Population, the Village of Abbey recorded a population of 129 living in 65 of its 88 total private dwellings, a  change from its 2011 population of 115.

Geography
Abbey is located south of the South Saskatchewan River and north of the Great Sand Hills

Climate
Abbey experiences a semi-arid climate (Köppen climate classification BSk) with long, cold, dry winters and short, warm summers.

See also

List of communities in Saskatchewan
List of villages in Saskatchewan

References

Villages in Saskatchewan
Miry Creek No. 229, Saskatchewan
Division No. 8, Saskatchewan